The 32nd Golden Raspberry Awards, or Razzies, ceremony was held on April 1, 2012 at Magicopolis in Santa Monica, California to honor the worst films the film industry had to offer in 2011. The nominations were announced on February 25, 2012. Taking a break from Razzie tradition of announcing both the nominees and winners before the Academy Awards functions by one day, it was decided in January 2012 to delay both the Razzie nomination announcements and ceremony by several weeks in order for the actual Razzie ceremony to be held on April Fool's Day. The actual nominations however, still had some connection to the Oscars ceremony, as they were announced the night before the Academy Awards were held.

Adam Sandler received a Razzie record six nominations as an individual and a total of twenty-three nominations for films he was involved with.

Voting for Worst Screen Ensemble was not just determined by members of the Golden Raspberry Award Foundation. Voting for the award was opened up to the general public online and conducted by the website Rotten Tomatoes. A grand total of 35,117 votes were cast.

Jack and Jill was nominated for twelve awards (including twice each in Worst Supporting Actor and Worst Supporting Actress) and won in every category. This was the first time in the history of the Razzies that one film won every award. The film also holds the record for most Razzie wins (beating Battlefield Earth) and most wins in a single year (beating I Know Who Killed Me).

Winners and nominees

Films with multiple nominations 
These films garnered multiple nominations:

References

Razzie Awards
Razzie Awards
2012 in American cinema
2010s in Los Angeles County, California
April 2012 events in the United States
Golden Raspberry Awards ceremonies
Santa Monica, California
Golden Raspberry